Paraphidippus is a genus of jumping spiders that was first described by Frederick Octavius Pickard-Cambridge in 1901. The name is a combination of the Ancient Greek "para", meaning "alongside", and the salticid genus Phidippus.

Species
 it contains fourteen species, found in Central America, Mexico, the United States, and on the Greater Antilles:
Paraphidippus aurantius (Lucas, 1833) – USA to Panama, Greater Antilles
Paraphidippus basalis (Banks, 1904) – USA
Paraphidippus disjunctus (Banks, 1898) – Mexico to Costa Rica
Paraphidippus fartilis (Peckham & Peckham, 1888) – USA to Costa Rica
Paraphidippus fulgidus (C. L. Koch, 1846) – Mexico
Paraphidippus funebris (Banks, 1898) – Mexico to Costa Rica
Paraphidippus fuscipes (C. L. Koch, 1846) – Mexico
Paraphidippus incontestus (Banks, 1909) – Costa Rica
Paraphidippus inermis F. O. Pickard-Cambridge, 1901 – Mexico to Costa Rica
Paraphidippus laniipes F. O. Pickard-Cambridge, 1901 (type) – Mexico
Paraphidippus luteus (Peckham & Peckham, 1896) – Honduras, Costa Rica
Paraphidippus mexicanus (Peckham & Peckham, 1888) – Mexico
Paraphidippus nigropilosus (Banks, 1898) – Mexico
Paraphidippus nitens (C. L. Koch, 1846) – Mexico

References

Salticidae genera
Salticidae
Spiders of North America
Taxa named by Frederick Octavius Pickard-Cambridge